Billy Milton (8 December 190522 November 1989) was a British stage, film and television actor. Born in Paddington, Middlesex, (now in London), as William Thomas Milton, he was the son of Harry Harman Milton (1880-1942), a commission agent, and his wife Hilda Eugenie Milton, née Jackson, (1878-1935).

Partial filmography

The Flag Lieutenant (1927) - (uncredited)
Young Woodley (1931) - Vining
The Man from Chicago (1931) - Barry Larwood
The Great Gay Road (1931) - Rodney
The Dressmaker of Luneville (1932)
Three Men in a Boat (1933) - Jimmy
Aunt Sally (1933) - Billy
Music Hath Charms (1935) - Jack Lawton
King of the Castle (1936) - Monty King
Once in a Million (1936) - Prince
Someone at the Door (1936) - Ronnie Martin
A Star Fell from Heaven (1936) - Douglas Lincoln
No Escape (1936) - Billy West
Aren't Men Beasts! (1937) - Roger Holly
The Dominant Sex (1937) - Alec Winstone
Spring Handicap (1937) - Len Redpath
Saturday Night Revue (1937) - Jimmy Hanson
The Last Chance (1937) - Michael Worrall
Oh Boy! (1938) - Conductor
Yes, Madam? (1939) - Tony Tolliver
The Key Man (1957) - French Waiter
 Playback (1962) - Second Drunk
The Small World of Sammy Lee (1963) - Store Manager
Heavens Above! (1963) - Fellowes (uncredited)
The Set Up (1963) - Simpson
Who Was Maddox? (1964) - Chandler
Devils of Darkness (1965) - Librarian
Monster of Terror (1965) - Henry
Licensed to Kill (1965) - Wilson
Mrs. Brown, You've Got a Lovely Daughter (1968) - Landlord
Hot Millions (1968) - Agent (uncredited)
Sweet William (1980) - Old Actor in play

References

External links

1905 births
1989 deaths
People from Paddington
English male film actors
English male television actors
20th-century English male actors